Andrew Ross or Andy Ross may refer to:

Sport
 Andrew Ross (footballer, born 1878) (1878–?), Scottish footballer
 Andrew Ross (footballer, born 1988), Scotland-born Virgin Islander footballer
 Andrew Ross (rugby union, born 1879) (1879–1916), Scottish rugby player, played for Royal High School FP and Scotland
 Andrew Ross (rugby union, born 1904) (1904–?), Scottish rugby player, played for Kilmarnock RFC, Scotland and the British Lions
 Andrew Ross (rugby union, born 1892) (1892–1981), Scottish rugby union player, played for Edinburgh University and Scotland
 Andy Ross (speedway rider) (1940-2006), Scottish speedway rider

The arts
 Andrew Ross (artist) (born 1989), American sculptor
 Andrew Ross (theatre director), former artistic director of Black Swan Theatre Company, Western Australia
 Andy Ross (born 1979), American musician
 Andy Ross (music executive) (born 1956), British music executive

Others
 Andrew Ross (Australian politician) (1829–1910), New South Wales politician
 Andrew Ross (businessman) (1857–1941), Canadian businessman
 Andrew Ross (medical doctor) (born  1960), South African doctor specialising in family medicine
 Andrew Ross (minister) (1931–2008), Scottish minister, missionary and academic
 Andrew Ross (sociologist) (born 1956), professor of social and cultural analysis at New York University